On August 5, 2012, a mass shooting took place at the gurdwara (Sikh temple) in Oak Creek, Wisconsin, United States where 40-year-old Wade Michael Page fatally shot six people and wounded four others.  A seventh victim died of his wounds in 2020. Page committed suicide by shooting himself in the head after he was shot in the hip by a responding police officer.

Page was an American white supremacist and Army veteran from Cudahy, Wisconsin.  Apart from the shooter, all of the dead were members of the Sikh faith.  The incident drew responses from President Barack Obama and Indian Prime Minister Manmohan Singh. Dignitaries attended candlelight vigils in countries such as the U.S., Canada, and India. First Lady Michelle Obama visited the temple on August 23, 2012.

Shooting and police response
The temple was preparing langar, a Sikh communal meal, for later in the day. Witnesses suggested that women and children would have been at the temple preparing for the meal at the time of the incident, as children's classes were scheduled to begin at 11:30 a.m.

Wade Michael Page was armed with a 9mm Springfield XD(M)  semi-automatic pistol. Page had legally purchased the gun in Wisconsin.

Following emergency calls around 10:25 a.m. CDT, police responded to a shooting at a Sikh gurdwara located in Oak Creek, Wisconsin. On arrival, they engaged the gunman, later identified as Wade Michael Page, who had shot several people at the temple, killing six.  Page wounded an officer; after being shot in the stomach by another, he fatally shot himself in the head.   Four people were killed inside the temple, and three people, including Page, died outside. Page killed five men and one woman, ranging in age from 39 to 84.

Three men were transported to Froedtert Hospital, including one of the responding officers.

Initial reports said the gunman had died from being shot by police officers at the scene, but the FBI later clarified that Page, after being shot by an officer, died from a self-inflicted gunshot wound to the head.

Authorities released an audio recording of the incident, during which the first responding officer, Lieutenant Brian Murphy, was shot by the gunman. It contained the words "I have someone walking out the driveway towards me. Man with a gun, white t-shirt", followed by the sound of gunfire. In September 2012, authorities released video recordings taken by squad cars during the incident, including the moments when Murphy was shot, and the gunman being shot by another officer. Murphy was shot fifteen times by Page, but survived.

The Joint Terrorism Task Force investigated the site, and Oak Creek police chief John Edwards said his force treated the incident as a "domestic terrorism incident" in "the beginning stages of this investigation". Oak Creek police handed the investigation over to the FBI. They also investigated possible ties to white supremacist groups and other racial motivations. The FBI said there was no reason to think anyone else was involved in the attack, and they were not aware of any past threat made against the temple. U.S. Attorney General Eric Holder described the incident as "an act of terrorism, an act of hatred, a hate crime".

Victims
The six victims killed included one woman: Paramjit Kaur, 41; and five men: Satwant Singh Kaleka, 65, the founder of the gurdwara; Prakash Singh, 39, a  Granthi; Sita Singh, 41; Ranjit Singh, 49; and Suveg Singh, 84. All of the male victims wore turbans as part of their Sikh faith. Four of the victims were Indian nationals, while the rest were Americans. Prahash Singh, who was born in India had been a priest at the temple for around seven years, had received his green card in early 2012.

The injured included a responding officer, Lt. Brian Murphy, who was shot fifteen times at close range, including once in the face and once in the back of the head. He was discharged from the hospital on August 22, 2012. Sikhs for Justice, a New York-based group, pledged a $10,000 award to Murphy. Two Sikh residents of Yuba City, California donated another $100,000 to Lieutenant Murphy and praised his bravery.

Included among the injured was Baba Punjab Singh, a Sikh priest who was shot in the head. He was left partially paralyzed from the wound for more than seven years and died on March 2, 2020.

Perpetrator

Wade Michael Page (November 11, 1971 – August 5, 2012) was an American white supremacist living in Cudahy, Wisconsin. Page was born and grew up in Colorado. He served in the U.S. Army from April 1992 through October 1998, In the Army, Page had learned to repair the Hawk missile system, before becoming a psychological operations specialist. He was demoted and received a general discharge for "patterns of misconduct," including being drunk while on duty and going absent without leave.

After his discharge, Page returned to Colorado, living in the Denver suburb of Littleton from 2000 through 2007. Page worked as a truck driver from 2006 to 2010, but was fired after receiving a citation for impaired driving due to drinking.

Page had ties to white supremacist and neo-Nazi groups, and was reportedly a member of the Hammerskins. He entered the white power music scene in 2000, becoming involved in several neo-Nazi bands. He founded the band End Apathy in 2005 and played in the bands Definite Hate and Blue Eyed Devils, all considered racist white-power bands by the Southern Poverty Law Center.

Page's former step-mother apologized to the Sikh victims and said she had not been in touch with her stepson for the past twelve years, after divorcing his father. A former friend described him as a "loner" and said he had talked about an "impending racial holy war". According to his neighbors, Page lived alone, rarely left his apartment, and avoided eye contact with them.

Page legally purchased the handgun used in the shooting on July 28, 2012, at a gun shop in West Allis, Wisconsin. Page passed the background checks required, and paid cash for the gun, along with three 19-round magazines. The owner of the gun shop said that Page's appearance and demeanor in the shop "raised no eyebrows whatsoever".

Following the shooting, photographs of Page appeared in media reports showing him with a range of tattoos on his arms and upper body, which were said to show his links to white supremacist organizations.

Oak Creek Police Chief John Edwards declined to speculate on the motive behind the attack, saying "I don't know why, and I don't know that we'll ever know, because when he died, that died with him what his motive was or what he was thinking."

Reactions

President Barack Obama offered his condolences, calling the Sikh community "a part of our broader American family," and ordered flags at federal buildings flown at half-staff until August 10 to honor the victims. Obama called for "soul searching" on how to reduce violence. Wisconsin Governor Scott Walker and other officials also issued statements of sympathy for the victims of the shooting and their families. Nancy Powell, the United States Ambassador to India, attended prayers for the victims at Gurudwara Bangla Sahib in New Delhi.
Indian Prime Minister Manmohan Singh said that the attack being at a Sikh temple added to the pain, and stated that India stood in support of all peace-loving Americans who condemned the shooting. Following the incident, there were vigils as well as some protests against the United States by Sikhs in India.
 On August 9, Indian members of parliament in New Delhi joined ranks in parliament to offer condolences to families of the victims.  Jathedar Giani Gurbachan Singh, the highest-ranking priest within the Sikh faith, called the shooting a "security lapse" by the U.S. government, and recommended that Sikhs in the United States adopt all possible security measures at their temples. Oak Creek Sikh residents said the incident had shocked their community.

Many Sikh Americans did not approve of the protests in India against the United States, and strongly condemned the actions, such as flag-burnings, taken by the protesters. U.S.-based Sikh community groups pledged assistance to the victims and their families, and urged Sikh Americans to organize interfaith vigils. They also organized to send an emergency response team to Wisconsin. In some online forums, individuals with far right views expressed support for the gunman and his actions.

Many other Americans held candlelight vigils in support of the Sikh community, and dignitaries such as Governor Walker attended.  Congressman Paul Ryan introduced a bill in Congress condemning the tragedy which stated the House "condemns the senseless attack". On September 19, 2012, a Congressional hearing addressed hate crimes in response to the tragedy, before the Senate Judiciary Committee's Subcommittee on the Constitution, Civil Rights and Human Rights convened by Senator Dick Durbin.

In the aftermath of the shooting, Amar Kaleka, the son of Satwant Singh Kaleka, became involved in politics, supporting gun control and new legislation to reduce hate crimes. Kaleka criticized Obama, who visited the sites of other mass shootings, but not the Sikh Temple. Pardeep Kaleka said that the shooting was "a warning of the increasingly public and violent role that white supremacy would play in the next decade."

Since 2013, the Sikh Coalition has encouraged Sikhs to use the National Day of Sevā to honor the lives of those lost in the shooting.

Political scientist Naunihal Singh criticized the media response, pointing out that the shooting received less media attention than other similar shootings. He suggested that this was due to the racial and religious identities of the shooter and victims.

See also 
 List of homicides in Wisconsin
 List of right-wing terrorist attacks
 Murder of Balbir Singh Sodhi
 Sikhism in the United States
 2017 Olathe, Kansas shooting
 List of rampage killers (religious, political, or ethnic crimes)
 1984 anti-Sikh riots

References

External links
 
 Photos of 1st Anniversary Gurdwara Diwan at Oak Creek, SikhMuseum.com
 "The Nation" Relatives Speak of Those Killed in Temple Shooting", Time Magazine, 7 August 2012
 Timeline: Wisconsin Gurdwara Shooting, Sikh 24
 Gallery of images from the scene of the shooting, BBC News, 6 August 2012
 "Oak Creek Gurdwara Memorial & Remembrance Materials", South Asian American Digital Archive (SAADA)
 Sethi, Arjun Singh."Sikhs’ inclusiveness is lesson in fighting bigotry." Washington Post, August 8, 2012.
 Sethi, Arjun Singh." Oak Creek: An act of home-grown terrorism." Los Angeles Times, August 3, 2013.

2012 active shooter incidents in the United States
2012 in Wisconsin
2012 murders in the United States
2012 mass shootings in the United States
21st-century mass murder in the United States
Anti-Indian sentiment in the United States
Attacks in the United States in 2012
Attacks on religious buildings and structures in the United States
August 2012 crimes in the United States
August 2012 events in the United States
Crimes in Wisconsin
Deaths by firearm in Wisconsin
Hate crimes
Indian-American history
Mass murder in 2012
Mass murder in Wisconsin
Mass shootings in the United States
Mass shootings in Wisconsin
Massacres in religious buildings and structures
Massacres of Sikhs
Milwaukee County, Wisconsin
Murder–suicides in Wisconsin
Neo-fascist terrorist incidents in the United States
Race and crime in the United States
Racially motivated violence against Asian-Americans
Sikhism in the United States